Old Town Township is one of fifteen townships in Forsyth County, North Carolina, United States. The township had a population of 149 according to the 2010 census.

Geographically, Old Town Township occupies  in central Forsyth County.  Parts of the town of Bethania are located here, but nearly all of the original township has been annexed by the City of Winston-Salem and made part of Winston Township, including the original community of Old Town.

References

Townships in Forsyth County, North Carolina
Townships in North Carolina